The 2003 Rugby World Cup was played in Australia between 10 October and 22 November 2003.

Pool A

Australia

Head coach: Eddie Jones

Ireland

Head coach: Eddie O'Sullivan

Argentina

Head coach: Marcelo Loffreda

Romania

Head coach:  Bernard Charreyre

Namibia

Head coach:  David Waterston

Pool B

France

Head coach: Bernard Laporte

Scotland

Head coach: Ian McGeechan

Fiji

Head coach:  Mac McCallion

United States

Head coach: Tom Billups

Japan

Head coach: Shogo Mukai

Pool C

England
England announced their 30-man squad for the tournament on 7 September 2003. Danny Grewcock suffered an injury mid-tournament and was replaced by Simon Shaw on 3 November.

Head coach: Clive Woodward

South Africa
Head coach: Rudolf Straeuli

Samoa
Head coach:  John Boe

Uruguay
Head Coach: Diego Ormaechea

Lock Leonardo de Oliveira was replaced by José Viana on 24 September 2003, due to a back injury.

Georgia
Head coach:  Claude Saurel

Pool D

New Zealand
Head coach: John Mitchell

1 Ben Atiga replaced Ben Blair following a mid-tournament injury.

Wales
Head coach:  Steve Hansen

Italy
Head coach:  John Kirwan

Canada
Head coach:  David Clark

Tonga
Head coach:  Jim Love

References

External links
 
 

Squads
Rugby World Cup squads